Flávia Maria de Lima (born 1 July 1993) is a Brazilian middle-distance runner competing primarily in the 800 metres. She represented her country at the 2015 World Championships in Beijing without advancing from the first round. In addition, she won a bronze medal at the 2015 Pan American Games.

Competition record

Personal bests
Outdoor
800 metres – 2:00.40 (Toronto 2015)
1500 metres – 4:13.29 (São Bernardo do Campo 2015)

References

External links
 

1993 births
Living people
Brazilian female middle-distance runners
World Athletics Championships athletes for Brazil
Sportspeople from Paraná (state)
Athletes (track and field) at the 2015 Pan American Games
Athletes (track and field) at the 2016 Summer Olympics
Olympic athletes of Brazil
Pan American Games medalists in athletics (track and field)
Pan American Games bronze medalists for Brazil
Medalists at the 2015 Pan American Games